The Military Aviation Authority (MAA) is an organisation within the British Ministry of Defence and is the single regulatory authority responsible for regulating all aspects of Air Safety across Defence, with full oversight of all Defence aviation activity. It is part of the MoD, but operates independently, via a Charter signed by the Secretary of State for Defence.

History
The MAA was established on 1 April 2010 in response to the recommendations made by Mr Justice Haddon-Cave in his Nimrod Review, which called for a radical overhaul of military airworthiness regulation.

The authority incorporates the former Directorate of Aviation Regulation & Safety, previously the Defence Aviation Safety Centre (DASC) which had been located at RAF Bentley Priory until the station closed in 2008 and the organisation moved to RAF Northolt. The MAA, which is located at MoD Abbey Wood in Bristol.

On 1 April 2015, the MAA became part of the Defence Safety Authority.

Principal personnel

The MAA is led by:
 Director – Air Vice Marshal Alan Gillespie, CBE
 Technical Director – Rear Admiral Malcolm Toy

Previous personnel

Director General
 Air Marshal Tim Anderson (2010–2013)
 Air Marshal Richard Garwood (2013–2015)

Director
 Rear Admiral Paul Chivers (2015–2018)
 Air Vice-Marshal Stephen Shell (2018–2021)

References

External links
 

Air traffic control in the United Kingdom
Aviation authorities
Aviation safety in the United Kingdom
British military aviation
Defence agencies of the United Kingdom
Organizations established in 2010
2010 establishments in the United Kingdom